, originally founded as , is a Japanese car tuning and manufacturing company founded in 1986 and headquartered in Minami-ku, Kyoto, Japan. The company was named after its two founders, Yoshikazu Tomita and Kikuo Kaira. Several of its Tommykaira's custom cars have appeared in the Gran Turismo and Forza Motorsport racing simulation video game series.

Car tuning

In 1987, Tommykaira unveiled a tuned Mercedes-Benz 190E which was renamed as the "Tommykaira M19". The company subsequently released the M30E, which was based on the Mercedes-Benz 300E. However, from 1988 onwards Tommykaira began to exclusively work on automobiles made in Japan, establishing successful contracts with manufacturers Nissan and Subaru. In 1988, the company tuned for the first time a Nissan Skyline R31 (rebranded as Tommykaira M30), in 1993 the turn was for the Subaru Impreza (M20b) and the Nissan March (m13) and, finally, in 1994 the first Subaru Legacy Wagon (M20tb) received attention from the Kyoto-based company. The company focused most of its efforts on mechanical and aesthetic modifications to four cars- the Nissan Skyline, Nissan March, Subaru Impreza and Subaru Legacy.

Other models modified have included the Nissan 300ZX, Nissan Silvia, Nissan GTR R35, Toyota Vitz, Nissan 350Z and several kei cars from various manufacturers. Tommykaira has consistently rebranded the cars as if they were completely manufactured by the company itself, with the consent of the parent manufacturers: for example, a Subaru Impreza is rebranded as Tommykaira M20b or a Nissan 350Z as a Tommykaira Z. This phenomenon is not unusual around the world as German manufacturers such as Ruf and Gemballa operate in a similar way with Porsche automobiles.

On the other hand, the rebranding process carried out by Tommykaira has evoked some controversy directly related to the status of the company as a car manufacturer. According to the information spot provided by the PlayStation video game Gran Turismo 2 about the Kyoto-based company, "in 1988 [Tommykaira] succeeded in introducing Tommy Kaira M30, Japan's first fully modified high performance car [...][while] in 1997, [it] manufactured and marketed its original sports car, the ZZ". In general terms, the 1988 M30 model is regarded as the first integrally tuned Japanese automobile, an integral tuning that implied rebranding of the original model. This fact acknowledged the capability of Tommykaira as an important aftermarket manufacturer and prepared the way for the launch of the company as a consolidated car manufacturer with the self-conceived 1996 ZZ model.

ZZ Car manufacturing and economic crisis

By 1996, Tommykaira had solely modified pre-existing models manufactured by Nissan and Subaru; nonetheless, the heavy improvements worked out by the company on the cars made it gain recognition as a brand in its own right.

The company decided to develop its own original design, the ZZ. The ZZ was produced in Ironside way, Hingham, Norfolk, England, but the factory that manufactured the ZZ collapsed due to a blunder of the Japanese Ministry of Transportation which, in 1999, switched front impact requirements from European to US standards. In 2002, the car was relaunched as the Leading Edge 190 RT built by Breckland Technologies.

Rowen collaboration 
At the height of the economic crisis in 2008, Tommykaira agreed on a partnership with Rowen to make parts under the Tommykaira brand. One stipulation was that all designs must be cleared by Tommykaira brand owner, Mr. Tomita, before Rowen could sell the products. From early-on, the agreement was breached when Rowen unilaterally capitalized the name "Tommykaira" as "TOMMYKAIRA". This was found to be one of many violations cited in court and led to the breakup of Tommykaira's collaboration with Rowen. Despite losing in court, Rowen continued to sell and produce Tommykaira branded products well beyond the court decision leading to an abundance of unauthorized Tommykaira products with the logo being in all-caps.

Regaining independence 
By around 2015, the dispute with Rowen had ended and the Tommykaira brand (managed by then, Threeek's CEO Mr. Tokitake) was once again independent.    In a chance meeting with Japan Auction Parts co-founder, Mike Wyckoff, Tommykaira once again began selling and producing products for both domestic and overseas markets.

Tommykaira brand license holder, Threeek,  rebranded to GTS (Genuine Tommykaira Studio) in 2017 and sells Tommykaira brand products in Japan. JDM Parts Ninja (formerly Japan Auction Parts) is the exclusive distributor of the Tommykaira brand abroad.

Club international launch 
In 2020, at the height of the Corona Virus pandemic, with a dwindling number of Tommykaira car owners in Japan, local chapters were disbanded in favour of a global subscription club called, "Tommykaira Club International". The club also known as TKCI celebrated its launch in fall of 2020 and official first-year membership is 2021. The cost of a yearly membership starts at $88.

Models
(please take note that for almost all models engine tuning was offered only as an optional and that some models also had more tuning stages available; shown here are the maximum performances available for each car)
1987
M19 (Mercedes-Benz 190E W201) - I4 1996cc SOHC, 153 PS / 188 N⋅m
M30E (Mercedes-Benz 300E W124) -  I6 2960cc SOHC, 225 PS / 279 N⋅m
1988
M30 (Nissan Skyline R31) - I6 3000cc DOHC, 240 PS / 294 N⋅m
M20 (Nissan Skyline R31) - I6 1998cc DOHC turbo, 220 PS / 255 N⋅m
1989
M18Si NA (Nissan Silvia S13) - I4 1809cc DOHC, 150 PS / 177 N⋅m
M18Si/Si R (Nissan Silvia S13) - I4 1809cc DOHC turbo, 205 PS / 240 N⋅m
M30C (Nissan Cima Y31) - V6 2960cc DOHC turbo, 280 PS / 392 N⋅m
M30 (Nissan Skyline R32) - I6 3030cc DOHC, 280 PS / 294 N⋅m
M20 (Nissan Skyline R32) - I6 1998cc DOHC turbo, 250 PS / 275 N⋅m
1991
M30Z (Nissan Fairlady Z32) - V6 2960cc DOHC turbo, 350 PS / 456 N⋅m
1992
M20t (Nissan Primera P10) - I4 1998cc DOHC, 175 PS / 196 N⋅m
M20Si NA (Nissan Silvia S13) - I4 1998cc DOHC, 175 PS / 196 N⋅m
M20Si/Si R (Nissan Silvia S13) - I4 1998cc DOHC turbo, 235 PS / 289 N⋅m
R (Nissan Skyline R32 GT-R) - I6 2568cc DOHC turbo, 350 PS / 353 N⋅m
1993
M20b (Subaru Impreza GC8/GF8) - Flat-4 1994cc DOHC turbo, 265 PS / 329 N⋅m
m13 (Nissan March K11) - I4 1300cc DOHC, 90 PS / 113 N⋅m
1994
M25 (Nissan Skyline R33) - I6 2498cc DOHC turbo, 330 PS / 400 N⋅m
M20tb (Subaru Legacy wagon BG5) - Flat-4 1994cc DOHC turbo, 270 PS / 322 N⋅m
1995
R (Nissan Skyline R33 GT-R) - I6 2568cc DOHC turbo, 400 PS / 420 N⋅m
1996
ZZ (Tommykaira own model) - I4 1998cc DOHC, 195 PS / 196 N⋅m
1997
M25tw (Nissan Stagea WC34) - I6 2498cc DOHC turbo, 280 PS / 305 N⋅m
1998
M20fb (Subaru Forester SF) - Flat-4 1994cc DOHC turbo, 295 PS / 380 N⋅m
tb (Subaru Legacy wagon BH5) - Flat-4 1994cc DOHC turbo, 295 PS / 346 N⋅m
B4 (Subaru Legacy B4 BE5) - Flat-4 1994cc DOHC turbo, 295 PS / 346 N⋅m
25R (Nissan Skyline R34) - I6 2498cc DOHC turbo, 300 PS / 363 N⋅m
m13c (Nissan Cube Z10) - I4 1300cc DOHC, 96 PS / 127 N⋅m
1999
R/R-s/R-z (Nissan Skyline R34 GT-R) - I6 2700cc DOHC turbo, 530 PS / 534 N⋅m
2000
P-tune (Subaru Pleo mk.1) - I4 658cc DOHC supercharged, 83 PS / 105 N⋅m
tb-2.2 (Subaru Legacy wagon BH5) - Flat-4 2149cc DOHC turbo, 315 PS / 394 N⋅m
B4-2.2 (Subaru Legacy B4 BE5) - Flat-4 2149cc DOHC turbo, 315 PS / 394 N⋅m
2001
wR (Suzuki Wagon R mk.2) - I4 658cc DOHC turbo, 70 PS / 99 N⋅m
Baby Gang (Toyota Vitz RS NCP13) - I4 1496cc DOHC, 109 PS / 142 N⋅m
M20b-2.2 (Subaru Impreza GD) - Flat-4 2149cc DOHC turbo, 355 PS / 441 N⋅m
2002
ist (Toyota Ist NCP61) - I4 1496cc DOHC supercharged, 140 PS / 174 N⋅m
Voxy (Toyota Voxy R60) - I4 1994cc DOHC, no tuning
tb6 (Subaru Legacy wagon GT30) - Flat-6 2999cc DOHC, 270 PS / 341 N⋅m
B6 (Subaru Legacy B4 RS30) - Flat-6 2999cc DOHC, 270 PS / 341 N⋅m
m13 (Nissan March K12) - I4 1240cc DOHC, 105 PS / 140 N⋅m
Z (Nissan Fairlady Z33) - V6 3496cc DOHC, 304 PS / 397 N⋅m
fb-2.2 (Subaru Forester SG) - Flat-4 2149cc DOHC turbo, 283 PS / 394 N⋅m
2003
tb (Subaru Legacy wagon BP5) - Flat-4 1994cc DOHC turbo, 296 PS / 346 N⋅m
B4 (Subaru Legacy B4 BL5) - Flat-4 1994cc DOHC turbo, 296 PS / 346 N⋅m

Prototypes and production figures

ZZ-S (enhanced version of ZZ)
ZZII ($90,000 RB26DETT-powered sports car)
 The ZZ II was a $90,000 sportcar 2 door coupe production car with a mid mounted tuned RB26DETT (Nissan Skyline GT-R engine) rated at 550 PS (542 hp) with 6pot front and 4pot rear brakes. It also featured front and rear aero diffusers, and a fully built roll cage.
ZZIII (modernized version of ZZ)
Legacy Bh5 Tb (Total est.100-200 units produced)
Impreza GC8/GF8 M20b (Approximately 105 units produced, actual production number is unknown, TK105 is the highest verified badge number, by Tommy Kaira Club International, of this model)
R32 R & R32 RL (Total of 95 units produced)
R32 M20 and M30 (Total est.100-200 units produced)
R33 R & RL (Total of 50 units produced)
R33 M25 (Total of 400 units produced)
R34 R, R-S & R-Z (Total of 35 units produced)
R34 25R (Total of 199 units produced 2dr + 5dr)
GT-R R35 Silver Wolf Edition (Under the Rowen badge)
 Toyota IST NCP61 (Under the Rowen badge)
GT-R R35 Tommykaira Edition (debuted at Thailand Auto Show 2018)
Suzuki Swift M14

References

External links

 English site
 Japanese site

Vehicle manufacturing companies established in 1986
Automotive companies of Japan
Manufacturing companies based in Kyoto
Automotive motorsports and performance companies